The following outline is provided as an overview of and topical guide to intellectual property:

Intellectual property – intangible assets such as musical, literary, and artistic works; discoveries and inventions; and words, phrases, symbols, and designs. Common types of intellectual property rights include copyright, trademarks, patents, industrial design rights, trade dress, and in some jurisdictions trade secrets. They may be sometimes called intellectual rights.

See outline of patents for a topical guide and overview of  patents.

Types 
Some examples of intellectual property include:

 Artistic work
 Literature
 Music
 Painting
 Sculpture
 Computer program
 Indigenous intellectual property
 Internet domain name
 Invention
 Trademark
 Service mark
 Trade secret

Rights 
 Authors' rights
 Copyright
 Database right
 Industrial design rights (or registered designs)
 Intellectual rights to magic methods
 Moral rights
 Passing off
 Patents
 Personality rights
 Related rights
 Plant breeders' rights
 Trade dress

Law 

 Fashion law
 Integrated circuit layout design protection
 Plant variety protection
 Supplementary protection certificate

Copyright
 Berne Convention
 Copyright
 Copyright Clause of the U.S. Constitution
 History of copyright law
 Moral rights
 Philosophy of copyright
 Sound recording and reproduction
 Statute of Anne

Patents
 Patents
 History of patent law
 Biological patent
 Software patent
 Utility model

Procedures
 Patent application
 Patent infringement and enforcement
 Patent licensing
 Patent prosecution

Legal requirements
 Patentable subject matter
 Novelty
 Utility (patent)
 Inventive step and non-obviousness
 Industrial applicability
 Person having ordinary skill in the art
 Prior art
 Inventorship
 Sufficiency of disclosure
 Unity of invention

By region or country

 Australian patent law
 Canadian patent law
 Patent law of the People's Republic of China
 European patent law
 Japanese patent law
 United States patent law

Trademarks
 Geographical indication
 Protected designation of origin
 Trade dress
 Trademark (including service marks)

General topics 
 Anti-copyright
 Arrow information paradox
 Background, foreground, sideground and postground intellectual property
 Copyright for Creativity
 Copyright infringement
 Copyfraud
 Industrial espionage
 File sharing
 Music piracy
 Patent troll
 Plagiarism
 Scams in intellectual property
 Digital rights management
 Exhaustion of intellectual property rights
 Exhaustion doctrine under U.S. law
 First-sale doctrine
 Free culture movement
 Free software movement
 Free content
 Intangible asset
 Intellectual capital
 Intellectual rights
 Intellectual property brokering
 Intellectual property education
 Intellectual property infringement
 Intellectual property valuation
 IPR-Helpdesk
 Legal aspects of computing
 License
 Public copyright license
 All rights reserved
 All rights reversed
 Anti-copyright notice
 Copyleft
 Free license
 Share-alike
 Limitations and exceptions to copyright
 Fair dealing
 Fair use
 Freedom of panorama
 Right to quote
 List of intellectual property law journals
 Orphan works
 Public domain
 Reverse engineering
 Societal views on intellectual property
 Societal views on patents
 Soft intellectual property
 Soft IP

Legal agreements and government enforcement 
 Adelphi Charter
 Agreement on Trade-Related Aspects of Intellectual Property Rights (TRIPS)
 Anti-Counterfeiting Trade Agreement (ACTA)
 China International Copyright Expo
 Doha Declaration
 EU Directive on the enforcement of intellectual property rights
 French Intellectual Property Code
 Intellectual property issues in cultural heritage (IPinCH)
 Intellectual property organization (including a list of intellectual property organizations)
 International Union for the Protection of New Varieties of Plants (UPOV)
 Paris Convention for the Protection of Industrial Property
 Plant Variety Protection Act (U.S.)
 U.S. Immigration and Customs Enforcement
 World Intellectual Property Organization (WIPO)
 World Intellectual Property Day (April 26)

See also 
 Entertainment law
 Mimi & Eunice, a comic strip about intellectual property problems

Intellectual property outline
Intellectual property
Intellectual property